The Windward Road: Adventures of a Naturalist on Remote Caribbean Shores was written by Archie Carr and originally published in 1956.  It is an account of Carr's travels around the Caribbean to study sea turtles and their migratory and behavior patterns, especially Kemp's ridley, a species about which little was known at the time.  This book led to the formation of The Brotherhood of the Green Turtle, which later became the Caribbean Conservation Corporation, and is now known as the Sea Turtle Conservancy.  It was awarded the 1957 John Burroughs Medal for nature writing, which is awarded annually by the American Museum of Natural History.  The chapter entitled "The Black Beach", originally published in Mademoiselle, won a 1956 O. Henry Award.

References

External links

1956 non-fiction books
1956 in the environment
1980 in the environment
Environmental non-fiction books
Nature books
Turtle conservation
Sea turtles
Books about turtles
Alfred A. Knopf books